Lorena Julia Bertha Bosmans Pastrana (born 10 February 1984) is a Peruvian football former player and manager. She played as a left back. She has been a member of the Peru women's national team as both player and head coach.

International career
Bosmans capped for Peru at senior level during the 2003 South American Women's Football Championship.

International goals
Scores and results list Peru's goal tally first

Managerial career
Bosmans managed the Peru women's national football team at the 2006 South American Championship.

References

External links

1984 births
Living people
Peruvian women's footballers
Women's association football fullbacks
Peru women's international footballers
Peruvian football managers
Female association football managers
Women's association football managers
Peru women's national football team managers